Sakhteman may refer to:
 Sakhteman, Fars
 Sakhteman, Khuzestan
 Sakhteman, Sistan and Baluchestan
 Sakhteman, Chaypareh, West Azerbaijan Province
 Sakhteman, Poldasht, West Azerbaijan Province